Hiram Horatio Giles (March 22, 1820 – May 10, 1895) was an American farmer, businessman, and politician.

Biography

Giles was born in New Salem, Massachusetts. He moved to Erie County, Pennsylvania, and lived on a farm for two years from 1842 to 1844. He moved to the Wisconsin Territory in 1847 and settled on a farm in the town of Dunkirk, Dane County, Wisconsin. In 1852, Giles served in the Wisconsin State Assembly and in the Wisconsin Senate from 1855 to 1858. Giles was a Whig and then a Republican. From 1871 to 1881, he worked for the Milwaukee & Prairie du Chien Railroad as a claims and right of way agent. From 1871 to 1891, Giles served on the Wisconsin Board of Charities and Reform. Hiram Giles died in Madison, Wisconsin.

Notes

External links

1820 births
1895 deaths
People from New Salem, Massachusetts
People from Dunkirk, Wisconsin
Businesspeople from Wisconsin
Farmers from Wisconsin
Wisconsin Whigs
Wisconsin state senators
Republican Party members of the Wisconsin State Assembly